Burns Lake Airport  is located  northwest of Burns Lake, British Columbia, Canada.

See also
Burns Lake (LD Air) Water Aerodrome

References

External links
Page about this airport on COPA's Places to Fly airport directory

Registered aerodromes in British Columbia
Regional District of Bulkley-Nechako